A cathedral is a Christian church which contains the seat of a bishop.

Cathedral or The Cathedral may also refer to:

Geography
 Cathedral, Colorado
 Cathedral Cavern (disambiguation), the name for several natural and industrial structures
 Cathedral Caves, a series of sea caves in southern New Zealand
 Cathedral Mansions Apartment Buildings, historic buildings in Washington, D.C.
 Cathedral Provincial Park and Protected Area, in British Columbia, Canada
 The Cathedral, a mountain in Utah, US

Arts, entertainment, and media

Art and architecture
 Architecture of cathedrals and great churches
 The Cathedral (Katedrála), a 1912–13 painting by František Kupka
 The Cathedral (sculpture), Rodin

Films

 The Cathedral (2002 film), a short animated film by Tomasz Baginski, based on the Jacek Dukaj story
 La Cathédrale (film), a 2006 film
 The Cathedral (2021 film), an American drama film

Literature
 Cathedral (children's book), a 1973 illustrated book by David Macaulay
 Cathedral (novel), a 1981 book written by Nelson DeMille
 "Cathedral" (short story), a 1983 short story by Raymond Carver
Cathedral (short story collection), a 1983 book of short stories by Raymond Carver
 "The Cathedral" (Dukaj short story), a 2000 short story by Jacek Dukaj, adapted into a short film
 The Cathedral (Honchar novel), a 1968 novel by Oles Honchar
 The Cathedral (Huysmans novel), an 1898 novel by Joris-Karl Huysmans
 "The Cathedral" (play), a 1936 play by Hugh Walpole, an adaptation of his novel
 The Cathedral, a 1922 novel by Hugh Walpole
 The Cathedral and the Bazaar: Musings on Linux and Open Source by an Accidental Revolutionary (abbreviated CatB), Eric Raymond's 1997 essay and 1999 book on software methods, including the Cathedral model of software development

Music

Groups
 Cathedral (band), a British metal band
 Cathedral Quartet, often known as simply The Cathedrals, a southern gospel singing quartet
 Cathedrals, a pop duo from San Francisco, California

Albums
 Cathedral (Castanets album), 2004
 Cathedral (Currensy album), 2015
 Cathedrals (album), a 2014 album by Tenth Avenue North

Songs
 "Cathedral", a 1982 song by Van Halen from Diver Down
 "Cathedral", a 1977 song by Crosby Stills and Nash from CSN
 "Cathedrals," a 1998 song by Jump, Little Children from Magazine

Other uses in arts, entertainment, and media
 Cathedral (board game), a two-player abstract strategy board game
 Cathedral (TV series), a BBC documentary miniseries first broadcast in 2005

Schools
 Cathedral High School (disambiguation)
 Cathedral School for Boys

See also 
 Catedral (disambiguation)
 Pro-cathedral
 :Category:Cathedrals for a list of specific cathedrals